Abigail Raye (born 17 May 1991) is a British field hockey player.

Career
Raye won bronze medals at the 2013 Women's Pan American Cup and at the 2015 Pan American Games. She also participated at the 2009 Women's Pan American Cup, the 2011 Pan American Games, the 2010 and 2014 Commonwealth Games She later moved to Belgium and represented them since the 2019 Women's EuroHockey Nations Championship.

Personal life
Raye became a Canadian citizen in 2009 after emigrating from the United Kingdom in December 2005.

References

1991 births
Living people
Canadian female field hockey players
Field hockey players at the 2011 Pan American Games
Field hockey players at the 2015 Pan American Games
Pan American Games bronze medalists for Canada
Pan American Games medalists in field hockey
Field hockey players at the 2010 Commonwealth Games
Field hockey players at the 2014 Commonwealth Games
Commonwealth Games competitors for Canada
Medalists at the 2015 Pan American Games